La Parita is an unincorporated community in Atascosa County, in the U.S. state of Texas. According to the Handbook of Texas, the community had a population of 48 in 2000. It is located within the San Antonio metropolitan area.

History
La Parita was founded by brothers John and Joe Chupick sometime around 1922 and established a store and lumberyard to convince people to move there. In 1933, La Parita had one business, and area residents would gather at the site of a bridge over La Parita Creek for picnics on the fourth of July and other regional gatherings. It was also the site of a Four-H club in the 1940s. The community did not develop even though oil was discovered near there in 1950. The store remained open until 1956. The community only had a few scattered houses in 1987 and had a population of 48 in 2000.

Geography

Education
La Parita had its own school established in 1875 which was then abandoned in 1884. John and Joe Chupick purchased land in the neighborhood that the school was located in to build the community. A new school was built in 1924 on land that was donated by John and Rosey Matocha. It first had two classrooms, then gained another one in 1933 and had 100 students enrolled and three teachers employed. The school joined the Jourdanton Independent School District in the early 1950s. The community continues to be served by the Jourdanton ISD today.

References

Unincorporated communities in Atascosa County, Texas
Unincorporated communities in Texas